The 1966 Oakland Raiders season  was their seventh season in Oakland and in the American Football League. Led by first-year head coach John Rauch, the Raiders played their home games  in the new Oakland–Alameda County Coliseum, and finished at 8–5–1, second place in the Western division.

In April 1966, AFL commissioner Joe Foss resigned and was succeeded by Al Davis, the head coach and general manager of the Raiders. Offensive backs coach Rauch was promoted to head coach and Scotty Stirling became the general manager. After the AFL–NFL merger agreement in June was made without his involvement, Davis resigned in late July; he returned to the team, but did not coach again.

Schedule

Standings

References

Oakland
Oakland Raiders seasons
Oakland